Patrick Henry Gibbs (born April 5, 1950) is a former American football defensive back who played for the Philadelphia Eagles of the National Football League.

Gibbs played college football at Lamar University, where he also played wide receiver.  He was drafted by the Eagles in the 9th round of the 1972 NFL Draft with the 222nd overall selection. He made the Eagles for the 1972 regular season and played in their first two games, primarily as a kick returner.  Against the Dallas Cowboys on September 17 he returned two kickoffs for 44 yards.  In his second game against the Cleveland Browns on September 24 he returned one kickoff for 17 yards and one punt for 8 yards.  In the second half of that game while attempting to field a kickoff he suffered a torn medial collateral ligament in his knee that required surgery and he had to miss the rest of the season.  The Eagles waived him during the 1973 preseason.  He joined the Houston Texans of the World Football League (who relocated during the season to Shreveport, Louisiana to play as the Shreveport Steamer) for the 1974 season.  He finished the season tied for 4th in the league with 8 interceptions.  He also returned punts for the Texans/Steamer.  He was suspended by the Steamer before their 1975 season began after he left camp without permission after losing his starting job.  He signed with the New Orleans Saints for the 1976 NFL season but was cut during the preseason.

References

1950 births
Living people
American football defensive backs
Lamar Cardinals football players
Lamar University alumni
Philadelphia Eagles players
People from Marshall, Texas
Shreveport Steamer players